This is a list of old salsa music and son cubano vocalists, as well as clave (rhythm) related styles, like guaracha, guagancó, mambo, cha cha cha, bomba.

A 

Mark Anthony
Carlos Argentino
Joe Arroyo
Vitín Avilés

B 

Félix Baloy
Justo Betancourt
Rubén Blades

C 
Tony Camargo	
Angel Canales	
Héctor Casanova	
Santiago Cerón
Santos Colón
Willie Colón
Bobby Cruz
Celia Cruz

D 
Frankie Dante	
Chivirico Dávila
Oscar D'León

E

F 
Roberto Faz
Cheo Feliciano

G

I

K 

Israel Kantor

L 
Rolando Laserie
Héctor Lavoe
Pío Leyva
La Lupe

M 
Antonio Machín
José Mangual Jr.
Melcochita
Meñique
Ismael Miranda
Monguito
Andy Montañez
Beny Moré

N

O 

Eliades Ochoa

P 

Guillermo Portabales
Omara Portuondo

Q 
Joe Quijano
Ismael Quintana
Miguel Quintana

R 
Ismael Rivera
Mon Rivera
Pellín Rodríguez
Tito Rodríguez
Elliot Romero

S 
Jimmy Sabater
Gilberto Santa Rosa
Adalberto Santiago
Luis Angel Silva "Melón"
Pete "El Conde" Rodríguez
Marvin Santiago

T 
Luigi Teixidor
Roberto Torres

U

V 
Cuco Valoy
Miguelito Valdés
Johnny Ventura

W

X

Y

Z 

Lists of singers